Polish Squash Federation ("Polska Federacja Squasha" in Polish) is the National Organisation for Squash in Poland.

External links
 Official site

Squash in Poland
National members of the World Squash Federation
Squash